Blood Monkey is a 2007 American direct-to-video natural horror film produced by RHI Entertainment and directed by Robert Young. It aired on various video on demand channels, before officially premiering in the United States on the Syfy Channel on January 7, 2008. Filmed in Thailand, it is the first film in the Maneater Series produced under an agreement with Syfy.

The film followed a group of six students studying primates in Asia under the demented Professor Hamilton who find themselves under attack from bloodthirsty primates in the jungle.

Reviewers panned the film, criticizing the acting, dialogue, plot, low-quality special effects, and the lack of appearances by the titular monster, the monkeys. They also questioned the appearance of F. Murray Abraham in the film, though note that his performance was its only positive aspect.

Plot

Anthropological professor Conrad Hamilton attempts to study a new species of primate, possibly the missing link between humanity and the great ape, found in a hidden valley deep within the jungles of Thailand. Hamilton's initial research team tries to capture one of these new (and very large) primates, but they are all killed. Hamilton and his assistant Chenne, who survive because they are away from the campsite, scour the area looking for clues and the remains of their team.

Meanwhile, another research team is inbound: a crew of college anthropology students with no idea what is in store. The students, Seth, Amy, Greg, Sydney, Josh, and Dani, are flown into a remote region of the African jungle and picked up by a guide who drives them deeper into the bush. He drops them off in a panic at the edge of the trail/road, which leads further into the foliage, claiming "bad things" are in there and will not go further. He heads back the way he came, leaving the students to march forth into the unknown. They walk until they reach the trail's end and set up camp. As evening sets in, noises from the jungle raise suspicion until a pair of glowing green eyes can be seen close by, watching. Before the unknown creature attacks, Chenne arrives with a flare that scares off the unseen menace.

Chenne escorts the students to the relative safety of Professor Hamilton's camp, and the following day they meet the obsessed man and somewhat learn of his mission and purpose. Hamilton professes dream findings in an uncharted valley deep within the jungle and their potential for career-launching documentation. He has Chenne confiscate their mobile phones and hand out information bracelets for each member containing their emergency contact info. Then he leads the slightly unwilling team to the valley entrance. After a pep talk, Hamilton convinces the students to continue and rappel down the cliffside and into the valley, injuring Josh in the process.

On their first night in the valley, Hamilton passes around a skull and explains that it belongs to the creature he is looking for. The students cannot identify the skull since its characteristics are both human and primate in nature, but nearly twice the size of any known human or primate cranium. They are soon interrupted by a bloody survivor from the original research team, who Hamilton and Chenne quickly shelter and care for. The man dies shortly afterward, and Hamilton tells Chenne that the creatures let him go as a warning.

During the night, Sydney visits the outhouse, only to be dragged away into the jungle. The next morning, Hamilton tells the team that Sydney came to him scared and homesick and wanted to go home, so Hamilton has Chenne take her out of the jungle, leaving everyone suspicious. However, Chenne drags Sydney through the brush in another part of the jungle and eventually leaves her battered and beaten. Sydney eventually stumbles into an unseen creature that tears the right side of her face off.

The team continues to follow Hamilton and Chenne, who appear to be tracking something with a GPS reader. Unknown to the students, Hamilton is tracking each of them by a hidden chipset in their bracelets. At the moment, he is tracking Sydney's bracelet. The team eventually demands more information about their expedition, and Hamilton comes mostly clean. The students remain unaware that they are being tracked but resolve to steal the AK-47 in Hamilton's possession and maintain control of the situation to themselves. Seth begins leaving a trail through the jungle by tying off pieces of cloth to trees.

On their third night, while the students begin to fashion their plan for the following day, a foul-smelling rain begins pouring down on their tents. Just as they recognize the smell as urine, Josh is yanked out of his tent and dragged up into the trees. Panic sets in as the team scatters and begins following his screams through the jungle. As Greg attempts to save Josh, Chenne accidentally shoots him, but then proceeds to tie him to a tree as bait. She camps out nearby with her gun, but one of the monsters sneaks up on Chenne and kills her before mauling Greg.

Hamilton runs across Seth during the chaos and knocks him unconscious after listening to his complaints. Hamilton locates the two remaining students, Dani and Amy, and continues his venture, ordering Dani to document everything with her video camera. Believing themselves to be the only survivors, both girls have little choice other than to follow the professor in hopes of being rescued. The professor successfully tracks Sydney's bracelet and finds it still attached to her severed arm, dangling from a tree. Hamilton examines an apparent rigging done to the tree, only to spring a trap that results in several bamboo shoots impaling him through the back. He delivers a final address to the girls before he dies.

Just as they turn to run, Seth appears, to their delight. They run back to their campsite, only to find it cleared of their tents and equipment. Completely panicked, they keep running while the monster seems to be following close by in the brush and in the trees. Dani is soon pulled up into the trees and killed, leaving only Seth and Amy standing. They run further still and reach a cave, where they see Seth’s entire cloth trail assembled and attached to the opening. They go into the cave and use the night vision from Dani's video camera to move around. At least one of the creatures follows them into the cave, grabs Seth, and kills him.

Amy sheds light on one of the monsters for the first time, revealing it to be a large Gorilla-like ape with a bloody set of fangs. Several more gorillas enter the cave, and Amy screams in terror as one of them bears down on her and kills her.

Cast
 F. Murray Abraham as Professor Conrad Hamilton
 Matt Ryan as Seth Roland
 Amy Manson as Amy Armstrong
 Matt Reeves as Greg Satch
 Laura Aikman as Sydney Maas
 Sebastian Armesto as Josh Dawson
 Freishia Bomanbehram as Dani Sudeva
 Prapimporn Karnchanda as Chenne

Production
In October 2006, RHI Entertainment made a deal with the Sci Fi Channel to produce a series of ten made-for-television natural horror films to air on the network the following year. Dubbed the "Maneater" series by RHI Entertainment, Blood Monkey was the first film of the series to be released. Although the agreement called for the films to premiere on SciFi, the first six films in the series actually premiered in Canada on video on demand due to an existing pre-licensing agreement.

F. Murray Abraham felt his character was "so interesting because he is so monomaniacal". For one scene, in which the characters had to scale a high cliff, the actors learned abseiling—the controlled descent down a rope along an extremely steep cliff or slope—and performed the stunt themselves. Abraham said it was a "thrilling" challenge. Matt Ryan felt the most challenging part of filming the movie was all of the running through the jungle that was required for many scenes.

Release
Blood Monkey premiered in Canada on the subscription-based video on demand channel Movie Central on Demand earlier in 2007 as well as other VOD channels before it aired on Syfy, then the Sci Fi Channel, on January 27, 2008. It was released on DVD on November 6, 2007 by Genius Entertainment, with no extras. The film was re-released to DVD on July 22, 2008 as one of three films included on the first volume of the "Maneater Series Collection" film sets. The other two films were In the Spider's Web and Maneater, the second and third films in the series, respectively.

Reception
Blood Monkey was panned by critics. Horror.com's Staci Layne Wilson felt Blood Monkey was "abysmal" with forgettable, expendable actors following F. Murray Abraham. In reviewing the film for DVD Talk, author Nick Lyons thought the six students were "stereotypical" and expressed sorrow that "respected award winning actor F. Murray Abraham...lowered himself to star in this." Noting that other films in the genre are often "so bad it's good", he felt Blood Monkey failed to accomplish even this dubious achievement. Most of the film was deemed "unwatchable" for mostly having scenes of the characters walking about aimlessly and a seeming lack of production values.  Monsters and Critics.com's Jeff Swindoll also questioned Abraham's apparently not knowing "better than to star in this dreck" as a "cheapjack version of Captain Ahab". He panned the film's laughable special effects, though he offered it minor praise for its "rather bleak ending" similar to the series' titular title Maneater. David Johnson of DVD Verdict criticized the film's low budget and "trite" acting, with no fright value when the actual creature doesn't appear until even the end of the film... Scott Weinberg, reviewing the film for FEARnet, considers the film "extra-stupid" and also notes the film's lack of appearances by the titular creature. Stating "the dialog is rotten, the actors are bad, and the FX are hilarious", he felt Abraham delivered "a patently perfect performance" and notes that he "gets progressively more outlandish as the movie goes on."

References

External links
 Official Sonar Entertainment Blood Monkey website
 

2007 films
2007 horror films
2000s English-language films
Films about apes
Maneater (film series)
Syfy original films
American natural horror films
Films directed by Robert Young
American monster movies
American exploitation films
Films shot in Thailand
Films set in jungles
Films set in Thailand
2000s American films